Sazlı can refer to:

 Sazlı, Aşkale
 Sazlı, Ayvacık
 Sazlı, Bismil
 Sazlı, Söke